Timon is a Brazilian municipality in the State of Maranhão. The population is 170,222 (estimation 2020) and the total area is 1765 km2.

Geography
Timon is located on the Parnaíba river which forms a natural border with the neighboring city of Teresina, capital of the Piauí state.

References

Municipalities in Maranhão